Mauro Montacchiesi is an Italian poet born in Rome, Italy, and living and working in Rome.

Biography
Montacchiesi is a writer and essayist, as well as an academician of the Tiberina Academy. In the last 15 years, he has been involved in the publication of his books of poetry, reviews, and essays for artists and poets. Montacchiesi is a member of the World Poetry Forum, and the Giuseppe Gioachino Belli Academy of Rome.

Published works

Awards and honors

 First place NATIONAL LITERARY Award “VOCI - CITTÀ DI ABANO TERME” ed. 2014 for the ebook  “Làbrys-Opus Hybridum de Labyrinthismo”, Aletti Editore 
 2015 the A.I.A.M. (International Academy of Modern Art in Rome) Golden Medusa Gold Medal CULTURE AWARDS << MEDUSA AUREA 
 Literary career award at Premio Europeo Clemente Rebora in Rome 2018-19.
 First place for the published with "Nell'essenza del nulla" books at the prize "Emozioni Poetiche" 2019 at the Castello di Verrone.
 First place for the published books with "La vita è amore" at the prize Marchesato di Ceva in Cuneo.
 Winner of the VII edition of the national literary prize "Scriviamo insieme" with the book "De Arte Atque litteris" 2017.
 1st classified Fiction Book section Prize Il Litorale

References

1956 births
Living people
Italian poets